The Fellowship of the Academy of Social Sciences (FAcSS) is an award granted by the Academy of Social Sciences to leading academics, policy-makers, and practitioners of the social sciences.

Fellows were previously known as Academicians and used the post-nominal letter "AcSS". This was changed in July 2014 to bring the Academy in line with other British learned societies.

Notable fellows of the Academy of Social Sciences

1999
The first fellows (then known as academicians) were elected in 1999. The inaugural fellows include:

 Archie Brown
 Ron Johnston
 Susan J. Smith
 John Urry

2000

 Andrew Gamble

2002
 Ronald Carter
 David N. Livingstone

2003

 Nirmala Rao

2004

 Tariq Modood

Prior to 2007
These people are known to have been selected sometime prior to 2007:
 Rick Trainor
 Lawrence Freedman
 Paul Matthews
 Theresa Marteau
 Til Wykes
 Ken Young

2007
 Susan Castillo

2008
 Kelvyn Jones

2009

 Thom Brooks
 Douglas Davies
 Anthony Forster

2011
 Wendy Larner

2012
 Greg Bamber

2013
There were 51 people elected to the fellowship in 2013, including:
Perri 6
 Ruth Wodak
 Loretta Lees

2014
There were 34 people elected to the fellowship in 2014, including:

 Richard Best, Baron Best
 Peter Buckley
 Iain Hay
 Jennifer Jenkins
 David Willetts
 Simon Williams

2015
There were 33 people elected to the fellowship in 2015, including:

 Julian Birkinshaw
 Craig Calhoun
 Jane Elliott
 Becky Francis
 Bob Kerslake, Baron Kerslake
 James Nazroo
 Martin Partington
 Stephen Whittle

2016
There were 84 people elected to the fellowship in 2016, including:

 John Appleby
 Madeleine Atkins
 Jo-Anne Baird
 Frances Cairncross
 Nancy Cartwright
 David M. Clark
 Greg Clark
 Diane Coyle
 Mary Daly
 Gillian Douglas
 Peter Fonagy
 Emily Grundy
 Andy Haldane
 David Halpern
 Charles Hulme
 John Kay
 Richard Layard, Baron Layard
 Gus O'Donnell, Baron O'Donnell
 Ben Page
 Bridget Rosewell
 Eileen Scanlon
 Mitchell Silver
 Nicholas Stern, Baron Stern of Brentford
 Matthew Taylor
 Anthony Teasdale
 Claire Tyler, Baroness Tyler of Enfield
 Gary Younge

2017
There were 69 people elected to the fellowship in 2016, including:

 Svenja Adolphs
 Louise Archer
 Peter Clinch
 Paul Connolly
 Sarah Franklin
 Rachel Griffith
 Susanne Küchler
 Alison Phipps
 Cynthia Weber
 Kaye Wellings
 Wei Yang

2018
Vivienne Marie Baumfield
Katrina Brown
Claudio Radelli

2019
There were 73 people elected to the fellowship in 2019, including:

Neil Adger
Linda Bauld
Michael Burton
Jane Duckett
Alison Fuller
Tim Leunig
Robin Mansell
Stephen McKay
Richard Moorhead
Inderjeet Parmar
Carol Propper
Sarah Radcliffe
Gillian Rose
Rorden Wilkinson
Daniel Wincott

See also

 List of social sciences awards

References

 
Social sciences awards